Carter House in Elkader, Iowa, also known as W. C. Reimer House, is a Greek Revival building built in 1850 as a duplex by brothers Ernest and Henry Carter.

It was listed on the National Register of Historic Places (NRHP) in 1976.  Its 1975 NRHP nomination document calls it a "lovely Greek Revival home" which "contributes substantially to the historic ambience of Elkader", having greater effect due to its location across from the historic Clayton County Courthouse.  As of 1975, it was relatively unaltered, besides having plumbing and electric service added.

In 2016, it is operated as a 19th-century period historic house museum by the Elkader Historical Society.

References

External links
Carter House Museum

National Register of Historic Places in Clayton County, Iowa
Houses on the National Register of Historic Places in Iowa
Houses in Elkader, Iowa
Houses completed in 1850
Museums in Clayton County, Iowa
Historic house museums in Iowa